The 2002 Southend-on-Sea Council election took place on 2 May 2002 to elect members of Southend-on-Sea Unitary Council in Essex, England. One third of the council was up for election and the Conservative party stayed in overall control of the council.

After the election, the composition of the council was
Conservative 33
Labour 11
Liberal Democrat 7

Campaign
The election saw a group of seven campaigners stand as independent candidates in the election. They described themselves as "the magnificent seven" and were standing in protest against plans to widen Prioy Crescent and to move St Laurence Church in Eastwood.

Election result
The results saw no seats change hands so the Conservatives kept control as a result with 35 of the 51 seats on the council.

Ward results

References

2002
2002 English local elections
2000s in Essex